Watoto may refer to:
 Watoto Church, a Pentecostal church based in Kampala, Uganda
 Watoto Child Care Ministries, a child care organization run by the Watoto Church
 Watoto Children's Choir, a children's choir made up of children from the Watoto Child Care Ministries